Takako is a feminine Japanese given name.

Possible writings
江子, "estuary/inlet, child"
孝子, "filial piety/serve parents, child"
高子, "tall/expensive, child"
崇子, "adore/rever, child"
隆子, "prosper, child"
喬子, "high/boasting, child"
尭子, "high/far, child"
昂子, "rise, child"
峻子, "high/steep, child"
嵩子, "swell, child"
貴子, "noble, child"
多佳子, "many, good, child"
多香子 , "many fragrances,  child"
たかこ, in hiragana
タカコ, in katakana

People with the given name
, Japanese competitive eater
, Japanese manga artist
, Japanese model
, Japanese politician
, Japanese actress and voice actress
Takako Fujita, Japanese Paralympic swimmer
, Japanese voice actress
, Japanese volleyball player
, Japanese professional wrestler
, Japanese actress
, Japanese actress and singer
, Japanese judoka
Takako Konishi (office worker) (died 2001), Japanese office worker and suicide victim
Takako Konishi (synchronized swimmer) (born 1986), Japanese synchronized swimmer
, Japanese long-distance runner
, Japanese actress and singer-songwriter
, Japanese musician, composer and writer
Takako Nakamoto , Japanese novelist
, Japanese violinist
Takako Ohkoshi, Japanese voice actress
, Japanese singer
, Japanese idol singer and voice actress
Takako Saito (born 1929), Japanese artist
, Japanese sport wrestler
Takako Shigematsu, Japanese manga artist
, Japanese princess
, Japanese manga artist
, Japanese volleyball player
, Japanese singer
, Japanese politician
, Japanese writer
, Japanese waka poet
, Japanese voice actress
, Japanese actress
, Japanese singer and actress

Fictional characters
, a main character from the Battle Royale novel, film, and manga
, a character from the manga series Chobits and its anime adaption
, a main character in the novel and anime series Otome wa Boku ni Koishiteru
, a character from the mystery horror novel Another and its manga and anime adaptions

Japanese feminine given names